Mae Yen is a tambon (subdistrict) of Phan District, in Chiang Rai Province, Thailand. In 2016 it had a total population of 5,429 people.

Administration

Central administration
The tambon is subdivided into 11 administrative villages (muban).

Local administration
The whole area of the subdistrict is covered by the subdistrict administrative organization (SAO) Mae Yen (องค์การบริหารส่วนตำบลแม่เย็น).

References

External links
Thaitambon.com on Mae Yen

Tambon of Chiang Rai province
Populated places in Chiang Rai province